Scoring the Deal is an American reality series that airs on HGTV and HGTV Canada. The show follows Jason Abrams and Kristen Cook of the Abrams Team through the world of Pro-Athlete real estate. It was aired from January 8, 2013, with only two seasons.

Show Synopsis 
For over a decade, Jason Abrams has been known as the "Jerry Maguire of real estate", responsible for buying and selling homes worth millions of dollars for pro-athletes. Jason's life provides a behind-the-scenes look into the intense world of pro-sports real estate. A dedicated, 24/7 working machine, Jason is equal parts real estate agent, concierge and tour guide as well as a marriage and credit counselor. 
"Scoring the Deal," has a similar premise to other real estate-themed reality television shows such as – "Selling New York," "Million Dollar Listing" and "House Hunters." 
During the season, Jason Abrams and his partner Kristen Cook handle real estate deals for pros such as former NFL running back Clinton Portis, Indianapolis Colts star Vontae Davis and San Francisco 49ers tight end Vernon Davis.

Cast

Jason Abrams
The Abrams Team is a national real estate group in the United States affiliated with Keller Williams Realty, founded by Jason Abrams. The company's clientele includes professional athletes with a high net worth, including NFL, NBA, and MLB players. As the CEO of The Abrams Team, Jason works in the residential real estate business as a third-generation real estate professional, with offices located in Phoenix, Detroit, and McLean, Virginia. 
Jason is also a founding member and part owner of one of the largest Keller Williams conglomerates in Michigan, a former Chairman of the Agent Leadership Council, and a former Keller Williams office manager of a 100+ agent office. A young entrepreneur, Jason is an active member of the communities in which The Abrams Team ® operates. He has taken on the roles of teacher, guest lecturer, non-profit executive board member and advocate as his contribution to the reshaping of the residential real estate business and communities nationwide. 
Through his unique niche company, The Abrams Team ®, Jason has a show premiering in 2012 on HGTV called "Scoring the Deal," which follows him and his team as they travel to different cities each week, along with an A-list of NFL, NBA, MLB and NHL megastars who are all house-hunting celebrity style.

Kristen Cook
Kristen obtained a degree in communications with a minor in Public Relations, and then began her career in the Staffing Industry. Cook has over 17 years of professional work experience. 
Her highly successful career has enabled her to transition from working as the National Staffing Director where she matched people with careers to a Luxury Real Estate Consultant where she matches clients with homes. Licensed in New Jersey, her business has now become national. 
Through years of dedication and passion she has constructed an "A" list roster of clientele consisting of celebrities, athletes and business executives. Kristen, as Vice President of The Abrams Team ®, brings forth her business acumen along with her warm, engaging, effervescent personality. Kristen manages the affiliates nationwide. Kristen's partnership with Jason Abrams has led to her role as co-star in an exciting new venture, the upcoming HGTV series, "Scoring the Deal."

Series overview

Season 1
Episode 1: A one of a kind Miami condo with killer views for NFL star Clinton Portis

Episode 2: NBA star Jordan Farmar looks in New Jersey while the NFL's Davis Brothers, Vernon and Vontae, sell in Miami

Episode 3: A family friendly luxury Manhattan condo for NFL Champ Cato June

Episode 4: NFL pro Joe Haden lists the family Maryland estate and NBA star Greivis Vasquez moves to New Orleans

Episode 5: A uniquely royal Miami home for NFL Pro Adewale Ogunleye

Episode 6: NFL pro Derrick Morgan looks for a more private Nashville home

Season 2
HGTV announced on February 25, 2013, that they have picked up a second season of "Scoring the Deal" due to the huge success of the first season with over 9,000,000 viewers. Season 2 will begin filming in May 2013.

Episode 1: A New England home for NFL pro Kyle Arrington

Episode 2: A comfortable condo that's close to the stadium for NFL rookie EJ Manuel

Episode 3: A multi-family home in San Francisco for NFL pro Keith Bulluck, his wife and kids

Episode 4: A home for L.A. Dodger Jerry Hairston Jr. and WNBA star Brittany Jackson sells her godparents' home in Tennessee

Episode 5: A home in Arizona for Diamondbacks Pitcher Brandon McCarthy

Episode 6: A luxury rental home in Toronto for NBA pro Rudy Gay and David Wells lists his San Diego mansion

Episode 7: A condo in Indianapolis for NBA pro CJ Watson, NHL star Kyle Quincey lists his Denver home

Episode 8: A luxury townhouse for NHL pro Gabriel Landeskog, MLB pro Bret Boone lists his San Diego estate

References

External links
Scoring the Deal official website
 
 IMDb Rating 8.9/10

2010s American reality television series
HGTV original programming
2013 American television series debuts